The Tschuggen is a mountain of the Plessur Alps, overlooking Arosa in the Swiss canton of Graubünden.

A gondola lift and a chairlift link the top of the mountain with the town and resort of Arosa — the base station of the chairlift is near to Arosa railway station.

Near the summit are located an observatory and a mountain hut.

References

External links
 Tschuggen mountain hut
 historical footage

Mountains of the Alps
Mountains of Switzerland
Mountains of Graubünden
Two-thousanders of Switzerland
Arosa